Jordan Thompson was the defending champion but chose not to defend his title.

Mikhail Youzhny won the title after defeating John Millman 6–4, 6–4 in the final.

Seeds

Draw

Finals

Top half

Bottom half

References
Main Draw
Qualifying Draw

2017 ATP Challenger Tour
2017 Singles